High concept is a type of artistic work that can be easily pitched with a succinctly stated premise. It can be contrasted with low concept, which is more concerned with character development and other subtleties that are not as easily summarized. The origin of the term is disputed.

Terminology
High-concept narratives are typically characterised by an overarching "what if?" scenario that acts as a catalyst for the following events. Often, the most popular summer blockbuster movies are built on a high-concept idea, such as "what if we could clone dinosaurs?", as in Jurassic Park or Air Force One explained as "Die Hard on a plane".

High-concept narratives differ from analogous narratives. In the case of the latter, a high-concept story may be employed to allow commentary on an implicit subtext. A prime example of this might be George Orwell's Nineteen Eighty-Four, which asks, "What if we lived in a future of totalitarian government?" while simultaneously generating social comment and critique aimed at Orwell's own (real-world) contemporary society. Similarly, the Gene Roddenberry sci-fi series Star Trek went beyond the high concept storytelling of a futurist starship crew, by addressing 20th century social issues in a hypothetical and defamiliarising context.  Planet of the Apes (1968) likewise engages in social commentary regarding race relations and other topics from modern human society via the lens of the ape civilization, in part as a response by screenplay co-writer Rod Serling to his experiences of anti-semitism.

Characteristics
The term is often applied to films that are pitched and developed almost entirely upon an engaging premise with broad appeal, rather than standing upon complex character study, cinematography, or other strengths that relate more to the artistic execution of a production. Extreme examples of high-concept films are Snakes on a Plane and Sharknado, which describe their entire premises in their titles.

A movie described as being "high-concept" is considered easy to sell to a wide audience because it delivers upon an easy-to-grasp idea. This simple narrative can often be summed up with a single iconic image, such as the theme park logo from Jurassic Park.  Along with having well-defined genre and aesthetics, high-concept films have marketing guidelines known as "the look, the hook and the book".
 The look of the film is simply how visually appealing it is to the public, usually before its release. Jurassic Park would show the world dinosaurs as they had never been seen before.
 The hook is the story the film is trying to sell to its audience.  Everyone wanted to know how dinosaurs could walk the Earth again after being extinct for 65 million years and how they would coexist with people.
 The book can be labeled as all the merchandise made to help promote the film. The merchandise in Jurassic Park was destined to sell well, with people wanting the T-shirts and lunch boxes that were shown for sale within the movie itself, with similar merchandise later to be sold at Universal Studios in the gift shop connected to the Jurassic Park ride.

Commercial benefits
High-concept television series and movies often rely on pre-sold properties such as movie stars to build audience anticipation, and they might use cross-promotional advertising campaigns with links to a soundtrack, music videos, and licensed merchandise such as DVD box sets. They commonly apply market and test screening feedback to alter the narrative (or even, as in the case of Snakes on a Plane, the dialogue) to ensure maximum popularity. Some commercial blockbuster movies are built as star vehicles for successful music and sports personalities to enter the movie business. In such commercial vehicles, where the onscreen activity is less important than the saleability of the product brand, a high-concept narrative is often used as a "safe" option to avoid the risk of alienating audiences with convoluted or overly taxing plot exposition.

Examples

Cinema

 The Shaggy Dog (1959; remade in 1994 and 2006)
 Planet of the Apes (1968; the original exemplifies the "analogous" category more than the sequels and remakes)
 Jaws (1975)
 Freaky Friday (1976; remade 1995, 2003)
 An American Werewolf in London (1981)
 E.T. the Extra-Terrestrial (1982)
 Tootsie (1982)
 Splash (1984)
 Ghostbusters (1984; remade 2016)
 A Nightmare on Elm Street (1984; remade 2010)
 RoboCop (1987; remade 2014)
 Big (1988)
 Who Framed Roger Rabbit (1988)
 Pretty Woman (1990)
 Sister Act (1992)
 Groundhog Day (1993)
 Jurassic Park (1993)
 Speed (1994)
 Stargate (1994)
 Junior (1994)
 Se7en (1995)
 Toy Story (1995)
  Twister  (1996)
 Independence Day (1996)
 Cube (1997)
 Liar Liar (1997)
 Grosse Pointe Blank (1997)
 Face/Off (1997)
 City of Angels (1998)
 Paulie (1998)
 The Truman Show (1998)
 Armageddon (1998)
 Small Soldiers (1998)
 The Sixth Sense (1999)
 Phone Booth (2002)
 Cellular (2004)
 Snakes on a Plane (2006)
 Yes Man (2008)
 The Invention of Lying (2009)
 TiMER (2009)
 Inception (2010)
 Buried (2010)
 Unstoppable (2010)
 Hobo with a Shotgun (2011)
 Ted (2012)
 The Call (2013)
  Pacific Rim (2013)
 Inside Out (2015)
 Zootopia (2016)
 Passengers (2016)
 Get Out (2017)
 Downsizing (2017)
 Game Night (2018)
 Tag (2018)
 Yesterday (2019)
 The Platform (2019)
 Chip 'n Dale: Rescue Rangers (2022)
 Barbarian (2022)
 Fall (2022)

Television

 The Time Tunnel (1966–1967)
 ALF (1986–1990)Mystery Science Theater 3000 (1988–2019)
 Quantum Leap (1989–1993)
 Sliders (1995–2000)
 24 (2001–2014)
 Hannah Montana (2006–2011)
 The Trial of Tony Blair (2007)
 Fringe (2008–2013)
 Dollhouse (2009–2010)
 The Execution of Gary Glitter (2009)
 FlashForward (2009–2010)
 Once Upon a Time (2011–2018)
 Wilfred (2011–2014)
 Awake (2012)
 Continuum (2012–2015)

 See also 
 Elevator pitch
 Log line
References

Further reading
 Truby, John. The Anatomy of Story. 22 Steps to Becoming a Master Storyteller. New York 2007. p. 17.
 Justin Wyatt. High Concept: Movies and Marketing in Hollywood''. 1994.

External links
 Rewind: Sometimes 'High Concept' Is Just Plain Old Awful at MTV News

Film and video terminology